Vinburnine (or eburnamonine, Vincamone) is a vasodilator. Vincamone is a vinca alkaloid and a metabolite of vincamine.

References 

Vinca alkaloids
Vasodilators
Lactams
Nitrogen heterocycles
Heterocyclic compounds with 5 rings